Kulun-Yelbyut is a rural locality (a selo), the only inhabited locality, and the administrative center of Chybagalakhsky Rural Okrug of Momsky District in the Sakha Republic, Russia, located  from Khonuu, the administrative center of the district. Its population as of the 2010 Census was 243, down from 300 recorded during the 2002 Census.

References

Notes

Sources
Official website of the Sakha Republic. Registry of the Administrative-Territorial Divisions of the Sakha Republic. Momsky District. 

Rural localities in Momsky District